Dewan Shahjahan Eaar Chowdhury is a former Bangladeshi politician. He was elected a Member of Parliament in 1986 and 1988.

Birth and early life 
Dewan Shahjahan Eaar Chowdhury was born in Netrokona district.

Career 
Dewan Shahjahan Eaar Chowdhury Jatiya Party politician. He was elected a Member of Parliament in 1986 and 1988 from Netrokona-5.

References

External links 

 List of 3rd Parliament Members -Jatiya Sangsad (In Bangla)
 List of 4th Parliament Members -Jatiya Sangsad (In Bangla)

Living people
People from Netrokona District
Jatiya Party politicians
3rd Jatiya Sangsad members
4th Jatiya Sangsad members
Year of birth missing (living people)